Got It on My Mind is the fourth and final album released by the Ghetto Twiinz. It was released on March 27, 2001, for Rap-A-Lot Records and Noo Trybe Records and featured production from Leroy "Precise" Edwards, Mr. Lee and J. Prince. Guitar and bass were performed by David "D-Funk" Faulk. Got It on My Mind peaked at No. 68 on the Billboard Top R&B/Hip-Hop Albums chart.

Track listing
"Intro"- :46  
"Gotta Get That $"- 3:47  
"Head Bustin'"- 4:33  
"Dumb Hoes, Fake Niggas"- 4:21  
"N.W.A."- 3:59  
"Got It on My Mind"- 3:11  
"Dukey Dukey F/Dirty"- 4:27  
"Tell Me Who"- 4:52  
"Rumble With the South"- 4:02  
"It's So Hard"- 4:50  
"Youza Soldier"- 4:41  
"Feet Don't Fail Me Na"- 4:36  
"Love Ya Baby"- 3:07  
"Outtro"- 1:10  
"Gotta Get That $" (Radio Edit)- 3:45

2001 albums
Ghetto Twiinz albums